Cassels' Store is a historic structure in McIntosh, Georgia. The structure consists of the remains of a store built in 1887. In 1983, the site was added to the National Register of Historic Places.

History 
The store was built by Robert Quarterman Cassels in 1887 on the site of a previous store in McIntosh, Georgia. The general store, located across from McIntosh's railroad depot, stood three stories tall and had an elevator. The store was officially known as R. Q. Cassels and Sons Store and was operated by Robert and his two sons. Following Robert's death in 1900, his two sons continued to operate the store until 1928. Upon its closing, the building fell into ruin, and today only some of the original structure remains. On August 5, 1983, the structure was added to the National Register of Historic Places.

See also 

 National Register of Historic Places listings in Liberty County, Georgia

Notes

Bibliography 

 
 
 

National Register of Historic Places in Liberty County, Georgia
Ruins in the United States
Commercial buildings completed in 1887
1887 establishments in Georgia (U.S. state)